My Girlfriend Is An Alien, is a 2019 Chinese television series starring Wan Peng with Thassapak Hsu. It aired on Tencent Video and WeTV from August 19 to September 24, 2019. The second season aired on Tencent Video and WeTV from September 16, 2022.

Synopsis 
The alien girl Chai Xiaoqi from  "Cape Town Planet" meets the CEO Fang Leng, who suffers from "heterosexual amnesia on rainy days", accidentally loses her beacon, and is trapped on Earth.

Chai Xiaoqi is not only an alien but also an amazing girl who will fall into a "boy crazy state" once she inhales the hormones emitted by men on Earth.

She experiences all kinds of funny and hilarious encounters, which will perfectly restore the nymphomaniac girl’s psychology of flirting with men for the audience.

In order to survive on the earth, Chai Xiaoqi will also use her various superpowers to solve unexpected trouble one after another.

Fang Leng is a different kind of boss. Once it rains, he will forget the girls who appeared on his side. So he has a variety of hilarious "battles of wits" with the Chai Xiaoqi.

Cast and characters

Season 1
Main cast
Wan Peng as Chai Xiaoqi, an alien who’s the lover turned wife  of Fang Leng
 Thassapak  Hsu as Fang Leng, lover turned husband of Chai Xiaoqi
Wang You Jun as Fang Lie, Fang Leng's half brother and Xiaoqi's best friend and one-sided ly loved her
Supporting cast
 Yang Yue as Jiang Xue (Heir of Jiang group, Fang Leng's childhood friend and obsessed one-sided ly loved him)
 Alina Zhang as Sister Chai (Restaurant Owner, Xiaoqi's landlady and friend)
 Wang Hao Zhen as Han Jinming / Assistant Han (Fang Leng's secretary)
 Christopher Lee as Fang Shi Da (Chairman of Future group, Fang Leng and Fang Lie's father)
 Hu Cai Hong as Aunt Zhou (Fang Shi Da's second wife and Fang Lie's mother, Step Mother of Fang Leng )
 Ashin Shu as Doctor Zhang (Fang Leng's therapist and friend)
 Gong Zheng Nan as Ai Lun/Alan (Jiang Xue's ally and a research scientist at Future group)
 Kris Bole as Mr. Filner (Fang Lie's art exhibition sponsor)

Season 2
Main cast
Wan Peng as Chai Xiaoqi
Li Xi Yuan as Chai Xiaoqi (young)
Thassapak Hsu as Fang Leng
Ma Chen Yan as Fang Leng (young)
Supporting cast
Wang You Jun as Fang Lie
Chen Yi Xin as Xiao Bu
Zhang Meng as Sister Chai
Eddie Cheung as Fang Shida
Wan Yan Luo Rong as Jiang Shiyi
Yang Han Bo as Jiang Shiyi (young)
Zhao Guan Yu as Assistant Han
Shu Ya Xin as Doctor Zhang
Hu Cai Hong as Zhou Siqin
Jia Ze as Chen Mengfei
Lin Jian Huan as Uncle Kang
Fu Shou Er as Mrs. Zhou
Liu Yi as Zhou Dong
Huang Xiao Ge as Mother Fang
Sun Zi Jun as Na Na

Production

Background 
Producer Li Eryun said that the play is a small but beautiful, positive energy dream sweet pet love drama, which has both a soft science fiction with a big brain and a love story core that is easily decompressed, and is committed to bringing relaxed joy to the audience At the same time as the romantic innocent story, spread positive positive energy values. The show was officially filmed in Shenzhen on October 20, 2018 , ended on January 4, 2019.

Opening sequence 
Thassapak Hsu a.k.a. Fang Leng gets encountered by a car accident and loses his consciousness and suddenly Wan Peng a.k.a. Chai Xiaoqi lands on the Earth in front of him and helps him to recover his consciousness suddenly the car due to crash explodes and she tries to protect Fang Leng from the destruction meanwhile her Annunciator (a precious stone from her home planet) gets penetrated through the body of Fang Leng inside his heart. After that, Chai Xiaoqi takes shelter in a restaurant owned by Alina Zhang a.k.a. Sister Chai and eventually gets appointed at Future Group of Companies by the president of the company Fang Leng.

Setting 
The shooting for the show took place in Shenzhen on October 20, 2018 and ended on January 4, 2019.

Soundtracks

Awards and nominations

References

External links 
 
 

2019 Chinese television series debuts
Chinese romantic comedy television series
Chinese fantasy television series
2019 Chinese television series endings
Television series by Tencent Penguin Pictures
Tencent original programming
2019 web series debuts